Bella Vista is a corregimiento within Panama City, in Panama District, Panama Province, Panama with a population of 30,136 as of 2010. Its population as of 1990 was 24,986; its population as of 2000 was 28,421.

References

Corregimientos of Panamá Province
Panamá District